Cookie Jar Butte is a tower in Kane County, Utah, in the United States with an elevation of . It is located in Padre Bay on the north shore of Lake Powell.

References

External links
 Cookie Jar Butte photo: National Park Service
 Weather forecast: Cookie Jar Butte

Landforms of Kane County, Utah
Buttes of Utah
Colorado Plateau
Glen Canyon National Recreation Area
Lake Powell